is a city located in Akita Prefecture, Japan.

Geography
Yurihonjō is located in southwest corner of Akita Prefecture, bordered by the Sea of Japan to the west, and by Yamagata Prefecture to the south. It is the largest municipality in Akita Prefecture in terms of area, covering approximately one-tenth the area of the prefecture, or about half the area of Kanagawa Prefecture.  Part of the city is within the borders of the Chōkai Quasi-National Park.

Neighboring municipalities
Akita Prefecture
Akita
Nikaho
Daisen
Yuzawa
Yokote
Ugo
Yamagata Prefecture
Sakata
Yuza
Mamurogawa

Climate
Yurihonjō has a Humid continental climate (Köppen climate classification Cfa) with large seasonal temperature differences, with warm to hot (and often humid) summers and cold (sometimes severely cold) winters. Precipitation is significant throughout the year, but is heaviest from August to October.

Demographics
Per Japanese census data, the population of Yurihonjō peaked in the 1950s and has been in decline since then.

History
The area of present-day Yurihonjō was part of ancient Dewa Province, dominated by the Mogami clan during the Sengoku period. Under the Tokugawa shogunate, part of the area came under the control of Honjō Domain, Kameda Domain and Yashima Domain, with a very small portion under direct rule by the shogunate (tenryō). After the start of the Meiji period, the area became part of Yuri District, Akita Prefecture in 1878, and the town of Honjō was formed with the establishment of the modern municipalities system. Honjō was raised to city status on March 31, 1954.

The city of Yurihonjō was established on March 22, 2005, from the merger of the city of Honjō, and the towns of Chōkai, Higashiyuri, Iwaki, Nishime, Ōuchi, Yashima and Yuri (all from Yuri District). Just after the merger, the new city of Yurihonjō had 126 representatives in its new city assembly, more than the whole of Tokyo.

Government

After the merger, Yurihonjō had a directly elected mayor and a unicameral  city assembly with 126 members (more than Tokyo Metropolis). The city legislature currently has 26 members. The city contributes three members to the Akita Prefectural Assembly.  In terms of national politics, the city is part of Akita District 3 of the lower house of the Diet of Japan.

Economy
The economy of Yurihonjō is based on agriculture and commercial fishing.

Companies headquartered in Yurihonjo
TDK Yurihonjo

Education
Yurihonjō has 15 public elementary schools and 10 public middle schools operated by the city government and five public high schools operated by the Akita Prefectural Board of Education. The prefecture also operates one special education school for the handicapped. Akita Prefectural University also has a campus in the city.

Transportation

Railway
 East Japan Railway Company -  Uetsu Main Line
  -  -  -  -  -  - 
Yuri Kōgen Railway – Chōkai Sanroku Line
  -  -  -  -  -  -  -  -  -  -  -

Highway

Seaports
Port of Honjō

Local attractions 

Amasagi Village is a complete tourist center in the town of Iwaki, northern Yurihonjō. It is centered on an historical facility, and it contains the samurai residence of the Unuma family (transferred from its original site), and a museum with collections of furniture and samurai armor.

A large standing Buddha statue.

Each year a large cherry blossom festival (April) and Azalea festival (May) take place here.

This park is famous for its yellow cherry blossom trees and it holds a firework display in May during full bloom.

One of Japan's Top 100 Waterfalls, grassy park, and hiking trails in the mountains near Mt. Chōkai.

One thousand stone statues of Jizō line the side of a hill in Oriwatari, Ōuchi.

A small but popular ski area on the lower slopes of the Mount Chōkai. It is especially popular with snowboarders.

A large plateau of outstanding natural beauty on the Akita side of Mount Chōkai. It includes numerous rental cottages and an amusement area.
 in the Ōuchi area is reputed to cure minor pains and many sufferers stay there long-term.
Yurihonjo Arena
Mizubayashi Athletic Field

Honjō Marina & Koyoshi River 
Rowing
There are 500 metre & 1000 metre rowing courses at the mouth of the Koyoshi River. A major public regatta takes place here each year in September. Three high schools in Yurihonjō have their own rowing clubs with a history of success in national rowing championships.
Marina, Sailing
Honjō has a wide beach with an adjacent yachting harbour.

Local events 
Fireworks
A fireworks festival is held every summer near the mouth of the Koyoshi River.

This religious event takes place in January in which a group of men and boys walk up the Shinzan mountain through the snow to Shinzan Shrine.  They wear only loincloths and thin shoes.

In March each year visitors can follow a map of public displays of the traditional Hina dolls at over 50 different locations around the city.

Mount Chōkai
 is an inactive volcano that stands alone on the border between Akita Prefecture and Yamagata Prefecture. It is 2,236m high and is the second highest mountain in the Tōhoku area. It is popular with skiers, hikers and climbers.

There are two main trails for climbing Mount Chōkai from the Akita side. One trailhead is in Nikaho, south of Yurihonjō. The other, in Yurihonjō, starts at the  Parking Area. A one-way hike from the Haraikawa commonly takes 3 hours and there are bungalows and camping sites on the lower slopes of this trail.

Local crafts, arts, and food 
 Sake (Rice wine)
There are four independent sake breweries in Yurihonjō: Akita Homare, Yuri Masamune, Tenju, and Dewanofuji.

Dried noodles which are eaten hot or cold. The texture of Honjō Udon is tough.

These elaborate decorative balls are made from silk thread and are a popular souvenir of Yurihonjō. 

A number of craftsmen in Yurihonjō produce traditional lacquerware.

This is a traditional folk song, known as min'yō, which is reputed to be one of the most difficult for singers to master. A national Honjō Oiwake competition is held in Yurihonjō every year over 2 days in September.

The foothills of Mount Chōkai produce many varieties of wild mountain vegetables and in spring and autumn it is common to see cars parked on the side of the road as people stop to pick them.

Sister city relations
 - Vác, Hungary, since September 25, 1996
 - Yangsan, South Korea, since October 10, 1998
 - Wuxi, China, since July 6, 2001

Noted people from Yurihonjō 
Akira Endo, biochemist
Mika Yamauchi, Olympic volleyball player
Natsuki Katō, model, actress and TV celebrity.
Akira Komatsu, footballer
Mikio Kudō, baseball player
Toshiyuki Igarashi, professional wrestler
Shu Watanabe (actor), actor
Rina Ikoma, actress, a former member of the idol group Nogizaka46

Notes

External links

Official Website 

 
Cities in Akita Prefecture
Populated coastal places in Japan
Port settlements in Japan